In the recent history of WAFL club South Fremantle Football Club, over 100 footballers have been recruited or drafted to VFL/AFL clubs and have won numerous accolades at the elite level. This list only counts footballers who played at least game at senior VFL/AFL level and who were recruited / drafted from South Fremantle.

South Fremantle footballers at VFL/AFL clubs except West Coast & Fremantle

West Coast representatives
 Wally Matera, 1987–1988: 24 games, 26 goals
 John Worsfold, 1987–1998: 209 games, 37 goals — 2× AFL Premiership (1992, 1994)
 Peter Sumich, 1989–1997: 150 games, 514 goals — 2× AFL Premiership (1992, 1994)
 Scott Watters, 1989–1992: 46 games, 13 goals
 Peter Matera, 1990–2003: 257 games, 213 goals — Norm Smith Medal 1992, 2× AFL Premiership (1992, 1994), 5× All-Australian (1991, 1993, 1994, 1996, 1997)
 Glen Jakovich, 1991–2004: 276 games, 60 goals — 2× AFL Premiership (1992, 1994), 2× All-Australian (1994, 1995)
 Phillip Matera, 1996–2005: 179 games, 389 goals — All Australian (2003)

Fremantle representatives
 Peter Bell, 1995, 2001–08: 163 games, 130 goals — All-Australian 2003
 Scott Watters, 1995–1997: 26 games, 6 goals
 James Clement, 1996–2000: 84 games, 38 goals
 Clem Michael, 1998–2002: 43 games, 11 goals
 Roger Hayden, 2002–2011: 128 games, 14 goals
 Paul Duffield, 2006–2015: 171 games, 33 goals
 Cameron McCarthy, 2017–2020: 49 games, 63 goals

References

External Links